Rina Mimoun is an American television writer and producer.

Career
Mimoun's career began at the age of 21 with a Writers Guild of America internship on the Fox comedy Ned and Stacey and a first staff writer job on the UPN sitcom Guys Like Us. She scored her big break when then-Dawson's Creek showrunner Greg Berlanti hired her as a writer on the teen drama series. Mimoun has also written for Jack & Jill, Dawson's Creek, Everwood, Gilmore Girls, Pushing Daisies, Eastwick, and Hart of Dixie.

She served as a supervising producer on Everwood for the first 12 episodes of season 1.  She was made a co-executive producer for the rest of season 1 and the entirety of season 2.  She became an executive producer and the showrunner for seasons 3 and 4 after creator Greg Berlanti left the series.

Mimoun developed and executive-produced Privileged for The CW Television Network, based on the Zoey Dean novel How To Teach Filthy Rich Girls.

Mimoun serves as an executive producer on Mistresses, an American remake of the 2008–2010 British series of the same name.

Personal life
Mimoun has been married to actor Scott Weinger since 2008; together they have a son, who was born in 2009.

Mimoun is Jewish.

Works

References

External links
 

Living people
American women television writers
American television writers
American television producers
Jewish American actresses
American women television producers
Year of birth missing (living people)
Place of birth missing (living people)
21st-century American Jews
21st-century American women